Schaal is an unincorporated community in Howard County, Arkansas, United States.  It is located near Mineral Springs and Nashville, Arkansas.

Former US Surgeon General Joycelyn Elders was born in Schaal.

Unincorporated communities in Howard County, Arkansas
Unincorporated communities in Arkansas